Aussiedown sheep are an Australian breed of sheep that was developed in the early 1990s using Southdown  and Texel  genetics. The resulting progeny have a maximum of 75% Southdown and Texel ancestry. They are mainly used as prime lamb sires, by crossing them over purebred or crossbred ewes.

High lambing percentages are common.

This breed is mostly found in the south-east areas of Australia, in New South Wales and Victoria.

References

External links
Aussiedown

Sheep breeds originating in Australia